Aleksandr Anatolyevich Borodkin (born 1 October 1971) is a Russian football coach and a former player. He is an assistant coach with FC Fakel Voronezh.

Club career
As a player, he made his debut in the Russian Premier League in 1993 for FC Rostselmash Rostov-on-Don.

Honours
 Russian Premier League runner-up: 1994, 1998.
 Russian Premier League bronze: 1999.
 Russian Cup winner: 1995.

European club competitions
 UEFA Cup 1994–95 with FC Dynamo Moscow: 2 games.
 UEFA Cup 1996–97 with FC Torpedo-Luzhniki Moscow: 3 games.

External links
 

Russian footballers
Russian football managers
FC Rostov players
Russian Premier League players
FC Dynamo Moscow players
FC Torpedo Moscow players
FC Torpedo-2 players
PFC CSKA Moscow players
FC Tyumen players
FC Moscow players
1971 births
Living people
Footballers from Moscow
Association football midfielders
Association football defenders